is a Japanese  manga series written and illustrated by Ryō Yasohachi. It is set in an alternate universe where humans are instantly resurrected after death, save for Vectors, who can spread "Resurrection Deficiency Syndrome". It has been serialized by Enterbrain in Harta since 2013, and is licensed in North America by Vertical. The manga received a sequel titled , which shows the story from the perspective of Vectors.

Plot 
It is a setting where regular people are Immortal, being able to get resurrected instantaneously. People who can die, are called "Vectors". The term Vector comes from the medical term for being a source of sickness. The condition is called RDS: Resurrection deficiency syndrome. In this world, when people get sick, they kill themselves to "reset" their biological state. People can get RDS if they fall in love with people who have RDS. People discover a person is a Vector when they refuse to get "reset."

Vectors are euthanized to prevent spreading their disease.

The two main characters are a Detective named Kenzaki Shinichi and "The Escape Artist." Kenzaki lost his sister because she fell in love with a Vector and committed suicide. 
The other main character, the Escape Artist, is a highly trained vector whose identity is hidden by a ribbon clipped to her hair. This ribbon makes her head a white-out to everyone else. The escape artist is just a term, and this escape artist's name is Kazama Rin, a police office clerk. 
The story focuses on the violent combat between Vectors and Immortals.

Release 
The manga started serialization in the sixth issue of Enterbrain's  manga magazine Harta on July 13, 2013. Vertical announced that it had licensed the manga in North America at its panel for Katsucon on February 12, 2016, releasing the first volume on July 26, 2016. The manga is also licensed in France by Ki-oon.

Volumes

Reception 
Jason Thompson of Otaku USA called the series' premise "interesting and suspenseful", though whether its ramifications would be explored would have to be seen. Thompson recommended the manga, calling it "a fun, violent ride with some cool mind games". Reviewing the manga for the Fandom Post, Matthew Warner found the first volume to have a "truly intriguing setup", praising the action and pacing, as well the way in which new information is introduced. Reviewing the third volume, Warner highlighted the powerful characters who "dominate attention when they're on the scene". Of the fourth volume, Warner criticized the unexpected capture of the Escape Artists, saying that it derailed the series and made it "a bit weaker and more detached".

The manga was chosen as part of the Young Adult Library Services Association's 2017 list of Great Graphic Novels for Teens.

References

External links
 

2013 manga
Enterbrain manga
Seinen manga
Vertical (publisher) titles